The Royal Springs Golf Course, is a public golf course located near Chashme Shahi over looking Dal Lake in Srinagar, Kashmir.

History
The Royal Springs Golf Course, previously the Salim Ali National Park is situated at the foothills of Zabarwan mountains over looking Dal Lake  and it is managed by Jammu and Kashmir Tourism Development Corporation, as quasi-government institution. The Royal Springs Golf Course, commissioned in 2001, is designed by the American golfer Robert Trent Jones Jr. It is regarded as one of the most picturesque golf course in Asia and has quality amenities like motorised golf carts etc. and is considered as No.1 golf course of India by Golf Digest.  This golf course is one such course which is open to non-members also (not restricted to members only) and golf tournaments are conducted at regular intervals. First ever women's golf tournament conducted at Srinagar valley, was arranged in this course in July 2012, which attracted more than 50 woman golfers across India.

Overlooking the golf course, in the hillside, is a heritage structure named Paree Mahal, built by Prince Dara Shikoh, son of Emperor Shah Jahan, during Mughal period.

Cork oaks groove

The golf course harbors a rare  groove of cork oaks, planted by last Dogra maharaj, Hari Singh before 1947 and the plants were imported from Europe. Cork had demand then, mostly for closing the bottles and the cork oaks and other trees escaped felling at the time of construction of the golf course.

See also
 Gulmarg Golf Club

References

External links
 Official website
  Golf  course at Srinagar 

Sport in Jammu and Kashmir
Golf clubs and courses in India
Sport in Srinagar
Sports venues in Jammu and Kashmir
2001 establishments in Jammu and Kashmir
Sports venues completed in 2001